

Wolf 1061 (also known as HIP 80824 and V2306 Ophiuchi) is an M-class red dwarf star located about 14.1 light-years away in the constellation Ophiuchus. It is the 36th-closest-known star system to the Sun and has a relatively high proper motion of 1.2 seconds of arc per year. Wolf 1061 does not have any unusual spectroscopic features.

The star

Wolf 1061 was first cataloged in 1919 by German astronomer Max Wolf when he published a list of dim stars that had high proper motions. Wolf 1061's name originates from this list. A seven years study found no evidence of photometric transits and confirms the radial velocity signals are not due to stellar activity. The habitable zone estimate for the system lies between approximately 0.1 and 0.2 AU from the star.

Planetary system

In December 2015, a team of astronomers from the University of New South Wales announced the discovery of three planets orbiting Wolf 1061. The planets were detected by analyzing 10 years of observations of the Wolf 1061 system by the HARPS spectrograph at La Silla Observatory in Chile. The team used archive radial velocity measurements of the star's spectrum in the HARPS data and, along with 8 years of photometry from the All Sky Automated Survey, discovered two definite planets with orbital periods of around 4.9 and 17.9 days and a very likely third with a period of 67.3 days.

All three planets have masses low enough that they are likely to be rocky planets similar to the inner planets of the Solar System although their actual sizes and densities are currently unknown. However, this information could be determined if the planets happen to transit in front of Wolf 1061 when viewed from Earth. Because all three planets orbit close to the star and have short orbital periods, there is a chance that this will occur. The University of New South Wales team estimated the chances of a transit at around 14% for planet b, 6% for planet c, and 3% for planet d.

One of the planets, Wolf 1061 c, is a super-Earth located near the inner edge of the star's habitable zone, which conservatively extends from 0.11 to 0.21 AU, or at most from 0.09 to 0.23 AU. It is one of the closest known potentially habitable planets to Earth after Proxima b, Ross 128 b, and Luyten b. The next planet out, Wolf 1061 d, could be marginally habitable depending on its atmosphere's composition as it orbits just beyond the habitable zone.

In March 2017, another team of astronomers re-analyzed the system using the HARPS spectrograph. They found planets b and c to be quite similar to their originally reported parameters, but found that planet d was more massive and in a larger, more eccentric orbit. The team was also able to find updated parameters for the host star. Their results showed that Wolf 1061 c is slightly smaller, yet closer to the inner edge of the habitable zone.

See also
 List of multiplanetary systems
 List of nearest stars and brown dwarfs

References

External links

 Simulated view of the Wolf 1061 system created by the University of New South Wales

 
Local Bubble
M-type main-sequence stars
Ophiuchus (constellation)
080824
0628
1061
BD-12 4523
Ophiuchi, V2306
BY Draconis variables
Planetary systems with three confirmed planets